Alec Taylor (born 6 November 1975) is a Zimbabwean cricketer. He played nine first-class matches between 1999 and 2003.

See also
 CFX Academy cricket team

References

External links
 

1975 births
Living people
Zimbabwean cricketers
CFX Academy cricketers
Manicaland cricketers
Sportspeople from Bulawayo